Mastax rawalpindi is a species of beetle in the family Carabidae with restricted distribution in the Pakistan.

References

Mastax rawalpindi
Beetles of Asia
Beetles described in 1963